Volar Airlines was an airline based in Palma de Mallorca, Spain. It was a successor organization to LTE International Airways and was rebranded as LTE again in 2005.

History 

 In 2005 the airline was renamed back to LTE International Airways. The new LTE ceased operations in 2008.

Fleet 
The Volar Airlines fleet consisted of the following aircraft in May 2005:

2 Airbus A320-200
3 Airbus A321-200
1 Boeing 757-200

References

External links

Defunct airlines of Spain
Airlines established in 2001
Airlines disestablished in 2005

de:Volar Airlines